Graham Fisk (5 February 1928 – 7 June 2008) was a British rower. He competed in the men's coxed four event at the 1952 Summer Olympics.

References

1928 births
2008 deaths
British male rowers
Olympic rowers of Great Britain
Rowers at the 1952 Summer Olympics
Rowers from Sydney